Infelice is a silent film directed by L.C. MacBean e Fred Paul and released in the UK on 30th September 1915. The script is based on a novel by Augusta J. Evans-Wilson.

Plot 
A general forces his married son to leave his wife for an heiress but he returns to her when she acts in the play of her life.

Production 
The film was produced by the British company G.B. Samuelson Productions.

Cast 
Peggy Hyland as Minnie Perle,
Fred Paul as Peleg Peterson,
Bertram Burleigh as Cuthbert Lawrence,
Queenie Thomas as Regina, and 
Richard Vaughan as General Lawrence.

Reception 
Infelice was a financial success for G.B. Samuelson Productions. It was shown in 681 cinemas

References

External links 
 Infelice IMDb

Silent film